Lazaros Semos (born 18 July 1975) is a retired Greek football defender.

He was a squad member for Greece U23 at the 1997 Mediterranean Games.

References

1975 births
Living people
Greek footballers
PAS Giannina F.C. players
Iraklis Thessaloniki F.C. players
A.P.O. Akratitos Ano Liosia players
Kassandra F.C. players
Doxa Katokopias FC players
Veria F.C. players
Acharnaikos F.C. players
Doxa Kranoula F.C. players
Association football defenders
Super League Greece players
Mediterranean Games bronze medalists for Greece
Mediterranean Games medalists in football
Greek expatriate footballers
Expatriate footballers in Cyprus
Greek expatriate sportspeople in Cyprus
Competitors at the 1997 Mediterranean Games
Footballers from Ioannina